Murad Akhmetovich Margoshvili, also known by his nom de guerre Muslim Abu Walid al Shishani (taken from the Saudi fighter Abu al-Walid), is the commander of  Junud al-Sham in Syria. Al Shishani was sanctioned by the US State Department on 24 September 2014 for reportedly building a base for foreign fighters.
While Margoshvili is a Georgian national, he is also a Kist, a Chechen subethnos living mostly in the Pankisi Gorge.

According to Russian sources, Margoshvili was killed in Syria by an airstrike of the Russian Air Force on 11 December 2021 in the city of Jisr al-Shughour.

References

Chechen Islamists
People of the Chechen wars
People of the Syrian civil war
1972 births
Muslims from Georgia (country)
Islamists from Georgia (country)
Living people